Sithathoriunet (her name means “daughter of Hathor of Dendera”) was an Ancient Egyptian king's daughter of the 12th Dynasty, mainly known from her burial at El-Lahun in which a treasure trove of jewellery was found. She was possibly a daughter of Senusret II since her burial site was found next to the pyramid of this king. If so, this would make her one of five known children and one of three daughters of Senusret II—the other children were Senusret III, Senusretseneb, Itakayt and Nofret.

Sithathoriunet was buried in the Kahun pyramid complex. She must have died while Amenemhat III was pharaoh, since objects with his name were found in her tomb. Her name and titles survived on her canopic jars and on an alabaster vessel found in her tomb.
The tomb was excavated in 1914 by Flinders Petrie and Guy Brunton. It had previously been robbed in antiquity but a niche in the burial site escaped the looters' attention. In this niche were found remains of several boxes filled with jewellery and cosmetic objects, such as razors, a mirror and vases. The jewellery found there is considered to be among the highest quality examples ever found in Ancient Egyptian tombs. Also found were two pectorals, one with the name of Senusret II, the other with the name of Amenemhat III. There was also a crown and several bracelets inscribed with the name of Amenemhat III. Most of the objects are made of gold with inlays of precious stone (cloisonné). Today the majority of the finds are located in the Metropolitan Museum of Art in New York although the crown is located in the Egyptian Museum in Cairo.

References

Literature 

G. Brunton: Lahun I: The Treasure (BSAE 27 en ERA 20 (1914)), London 1920 the book online
H. E. Winlock: The Treasure of el Lahun, New York 1973

Princesses of the Twelfth Dynasty of Egypt

19th-century BC women